Proactive communications is a customer relationship lifecycle strategy used to increase customer loyalty. It is related to the organizational psychology term proactivity, which states that individuals should act based on anticipatory behavior rather than reacting to situations. The strategy is used to provide customer care and build credibility through personalized customer management to anticipate common inquiries. It is used to reduce customer frustration and mitigate customer service issues before having the ability to happen.

Proactive communications include opt-in notifications and chats, social media responsiveness and multi-channel contact. The strategy is used during each phase of the customer lifecycle. The goal of proactive customer communications is to anticipate and streamline all interactions to be efficient and personalized for each customer.

Client retention
According to Direct Marketing News, there are three steps to improve customer loyalty through the use of proactive communications:

 Develop an understanding of the target audience and provide options for opt-in communications
 Tailored communications based on the individual customer's needs
 Customer control options for contact

See also
Proactivity
Cross-cultural communication
 Human communication
Communication
Intercultural communication
Augmentative and alternative communication
Mass communication
Communication rights

References

Further reading
 Strategic Communication for Sustainable Organizations: Theory and Practice. Quote: "This chapter focuses primarily on proactive communication: Proactivity has come to refer to a more or less unspecified set of nondefensive or nonreactive practices through which organizations handle their relations with the external world."
 "Doctor Proactive Communication, Return-to-Work Recommendation, and Duration of Disability After a Workers’ Compensation Low Back Injury". Journal of Occupational and Environmental Medicine. pp. 515–525.
 "Toward a theory for multiparty proactive communication in agent teams". International Journal of Cooperative Information Systems. 
 "A decision-theoretic approach for designing proactive communication in multi-agent teamwork". SAC '04 Proceedings of the 2004 ACM symposium on Applied computing. pp. 64–71. 
 "Multiparty Proactive Communication: A Perspective for Evolving Shared Mental Models". College of Information Sciences & Technology. Pennsylvania State University. pp. 685–690.
 "Modeling cooperation by observation in agent team". Systems, Man and Cybernetics, 2005 IEEE International Conference.
 "Proactive Communications in Agent Teamwork". pp. 271– . 
 The New Handbook of Organizational Communication: Advances in Theory, Research, and Methods

Organizational theory